Oxalidales is an order of flowering plants, included within the rosid subgroup of eudicots. Compound leaves are common in Oxalidales and the majority of the species in this order have five or six sepals and petals. The following families are typically placed here:

 Family Brunelliaceae
 Family Cephalotaceae (Cephalotus follicularis)
 Family Connaraceae
 Family Cunoniaceae
 Family Elaeocarpaceae
 Family Huaceae
 Family Oxalidaceae (wood sorrel family)

The family Cephalotaceae contains a single species, a pitcher plant found in Southwest Australia.

Under the Cronquist system, most of the above families were placed in the Rosales. The Oxalidaceae were placed in the Geraniales, and the Elaeocarpaceae split between the Malvales and Polygalales, in the latter case being treated as the Tremandraceae.

Phylogeny 
The phylogeny of the Oxalidales shown below is adapted from the Angiosperm Phylogeny Group website.

References

External links

 
Angiosperm orders